The True Colors Tour was a headlining concert tour by Russian-German music producer Zedd, launched in support of his studio album True Colors. The tour visited Asia, Europe, and North America from 6 August 2015 to 11 January 2016.

Set list 
 Intro of "Hourglass"
 Chorus of "Spectrum"
 "Beautiful Now"
 "Rather Be (Merk And Kremont Remix)"
 "Rude (Zedd Remix)"
 "Breakn' A Sweat (Zedd Remix)"
 "Stay the Night (Zedd & KDrew Remix)"
 "Straight Into the Fire"
 "Bumble Bee"
 "Illusion"
 "Break Free"
 "Clarity"
 "Fall Into the Sky"
 "I Want You to Know"
 "The Legend of Zelda"
 "Find You"
 "Papercut"
 "Done with Love"
 "True Colors" (Grey Remix)
 "Spectrum"

Shows

Notes

References

External links
 Zedd official website

2015 concert tours
2016 concert tours
Zedd